Jacks Creek is a  tributary of the Juniata River in central Pennsylvania in the United States.

The creek begins along the outskirts of a small village known as Bannerville.

Jacks Creek joins the Juniata River at Lewistown.

See also
List of rivers of Pennsylvania

References

Rivers of Pennsylvania
Tributaries of the Juniata River
Rivers of Mifflin County, Pennsylvania